George Washington Robinson (May 14, 1814 – February 10, 1878) was a leader during the early history of the Latter Day Saint movement being the first secretary to the First Presidency of the Church of Jesus Christ of Latter Day Saints. He was also a Danite leader and an official church recorder in the 1830s and was a member of the Quorum of the Twelve Apostles in the Rigdonite church established in 1845.

Early life
George Washington Robinson was born in Pawlet, Rutland County, Vermont.

Mormon covert

Church elder
George W. Robinson became the son-in-law to prominent Latter Day Saint leader Sidney Rigdon, having married Athalia Rigdon in 1837. Robinson also became the recorder of the church in 1837. During the Missouri Mormon War in 1838 Robinson became a leader of the Danites helping to protect Mormon settlers from and fight anti-Mormon forces. On April 6, 1838, Robinson was appointed the first clerk or secretary to the church's First Presidency, having previously served as the clerk and recorder of the Kirtland high council. Robinson was imprisoned in Liberty Jail with Joseph Smith at Liberty, Missouri for a period of time.

Nauvoo
In 1839, George Robinson became the first postmaster in Commerce, Illinois, which was later renamed Nauvoo. Robinson was released from his recorder and secretarial duties in 1840 when he moved from Nauvoo across the Mississippi River to Iowa.

Disaffection with Church leadership
In 1842, Robinson became disaffected with the leadership of Joseph Smith. During the 1844 succession crisis, Robinson supported the leadership aspirations of his father-in-law Sidney Rigdon. In 1845, when Rigdon created a rival church to the church led by Brigham Young, Robinson was selected as a member of the Rigdonite Quorum of the Twelve Apostles.

Post-Mormon years
In 1847, Robinson followed the advice of Rigdon and moved from Nauvoo to Friendship, New York, where in 1864 he founded the First National Bank.

References

1814 births
1878 deaths
American Latter Day Saint leaders
American Latter Day Saints
Illinois postmasters
Converts to Mormonism
Danites
Latter Day Saint leaders
Leaders in the Church of Christ (Latter Day Saints)
Official historians of the Church of Jesus Christ of Latter-day Saints
Religious leaders from Vermont
Rigdonites
Secretaries to the First Presidency (LDS Church)
Fellows of the American Physical Society